The Kerry International Dark-Sky Reserve (KIDSR) is a dark-sky preserve in County Kerry, Ireland. It was designated Ireland's first International Dark Sky Reserve by the International Dark-Sky Association (IDA). Kerry International Dark-Sky Reserve was awarded the Gold Tier Award on 27 January 2014, by the IDA. It was the first Gold Tier Reserve in the northern hemisphere, and is one of only four Gold Tier Dark-Sky Reserves in the world.

Location 

 Kells/Foilmore
 Cahersiveen
 Valentia Island
 Portmagee
 The Glen
 Ballinskelligs
 Waterville
 Dromid
 Derrynane/Caherdaniel
The Kerry Dark-Sky Group office is situated in Dungeagan, Ballinskelligs, County Kerry, Ireland.

History 
The Kerry Dark-Sky Group was created in 2013 after several out-reach meetings with local community groups in the Reserve at the request of attendees to the gatherings. The purpose of the Kerry Dark-Sky Group is to promote astro-tourism in the Reserve via community projects, local outreach, and events.

Collaborations 
On 5 August 2014 The Kerry International Dark-Sky Reserve officially twinned with the Aoraki Mackenzie Gold Tier Reserve in New Zealand.

References

External links 
 Official website
 Sky’s the limit for Kerry’s astro-tourism
 http://www.eturbonews.com/48918/alien-helping-lure-visitors-new-dark-sky-reserve-centre-ballinsk
 http://www.rte.ie/news/player/2014/0127/20513706-south-west-kerry-named-as-europes-first-gold-tier-dark-sky-reserve/

Dark-sky preserves in the Republic of Ireland
Protected areas of County Kerry
International Dark Sky Reserves